Parkview High School is a public high school located near Lilburn in Gwinnett County, Georgia, United States. It is operated by Gwinnett County Public Schools. The current principal is David T. Smith.

School-initiated organizations

Student Council 

Parkview High School has a student council composed of class officers, student council representatives, and Gwinnett Student Leadership Team members. The council is run according to the guidelines of a student-authored constitution written in 2014. The student council maintains contact with the Georgia House District 108 representative and takes a trip to the State Capitol once a year.

School newspaper 

The Parkview Pantera is a student newspaper published between 4 and 7 times per school year. Parkview students write articles and lay out the paper under the guidance of the newspaper teacher. Numerous Pantera staff members have gone on to study journalism in college. As of 2013, the Pantera staff maintains a website for the paper: phspantera.com.

Academics 

Parkview was recognized by the Department of Education as a Blue Ribbon School for the 1984-1985 school year.

Music and arts

Band 

In 2005, Parkview High School Band was awarded the John Philip Sousa Foundation's Sudler Flag of Honor. Parkview is one of four schools in the state of Georgia and 68 in the world to receive this award.

Parkview has also been placed on the Historic Roll of Honor of High School Concert Bands. This lists recognizes "historic high school concert bands of very particular musical excellence." The Georgia State Legislature passed Georgia Senate Resolution 1313 and Georgia House Resolution 2063 honoring the Parkview High School Band.

The Parkview High School Marching Band was the Grand Champion of the 2010 Golden River Marching Festival in Tallapoosa, with an overall score of 94 out of 100. The color guard and drum majors also received the highest scores in the competition. In 2016, the Parkview High School Marching Band was Grand Champion at 2 competitions, with the highest overall scores in all captions for both events.

In April 2011, Parkview High School Marching Band won the WSB-TV Best High School Band Contest. The tournament featured 64 high school bands from across Georgia, and the Parkview Band performed their baseball-themed show on Turner Field before an Atlanta Braves game.

Orchestra 

Parkview has four orchestras: Concert Orchestra, Philharmonic Orchestra, Symphonic Orchestra, and Chamber Orchestra.

Theatre 

Parkview High School is a member of the prestigious International Thespian Society. Members who join Parkview's honors thespian society are inducted into Troupe 4805.

Notable alumni 
 Ainsley Battles, NFL football player
 Brett Butler, racing driver
 Ken Butler III, racing driver
 Chris Carson, NFL football player
 Brett Conway, NFL football player
 Jeff Francoeur, MLB baseball player
 Jeff Keppinger,  MLB baseball player
 Brad Lester, football player
 Seth Marler, NFL football player
 Mac Marshall, MLB baseball player
 Jason Moore, former MLS soccer player
 Justin Moore, soccer player
 Graham Neff, athletics director
 Matt Olson, MLB baseball player
 Michael Palmer, NFL football player
 Lennon Parham, actor and producer
 Clint Sammons, MLB baseball player
 Eric Shanteau, Olympic swimmer
 Jon Stinchcomb, NFL football player
 Matt Stinchcomb, NFL football player
 Mark Thomas, NFL football player
 Josh Wolff, soccer player

See also 
 Gwinnett County Public Schools

References

External links 

 

Schools in Gwinnett County, Georgia
Public high schools in Georgia (U.S. state)
1976 establishments in Georgia (U.S. state)
Educational institutions established in 1976